Methoxamine is an α1-adrenergic receptor agonist, somewhat similar in structure to butaxamine and 2,5-DMA. It is no longer marketed.

See also 
 Sertraline 
 Phenylephrine
 Synephrine
 Phentolamine
 Midodrine

References 

Alpha-1 adrenergic receptor agonists
Substituted amphetamines
Phenol ethers
Phenylethanolamines